Hollow Elis (also known as Koile-Elis, or Vale of Elis) was a district of Elis, Greece. The district occupied the basin of the Peneus River. The district extended as far as Cape Araxos.

References 

Geography of ancient Elis